Tamara Zhimanskaya, Tamara Shymanskaya is a Soviet sprint canoer who competed in the early 1970s. She was born in Minsk. She won two medals at the 1970 ICF Canoe Sprint World Championships in Copenhagen with a gold in the K-4 500 m and a silver in the K-2 500 m events.

References

Living people
Sportspeople from Minsk
Soviet female canoeists
Year of birth missing (living people)
Belarusian female canoeists
ICF Canoe Sprint World Championships medalists in kayak
Honoured Masters of Sport of the USSR